Working Girls is a 1986 American independent drama film, written (with Sandra Kay), produced and directed by Lizzie Borden working with cinematographer Judy Irola. Its plot follows a day in the life of several prostitutes in a Manhattan brothel.

Plot
Molly, a Yale graduate in her late-twenties living New York City, works in a Manhattan brothel to support herself and her girlfriend, Diane. Dawn, a college student, and aspiring boutique owner, Gina, also work in the brothel, entertaining various male clients while Lucy, the brothel madam, is out shopping. In Lucy's absence, the three women covertly misrepresent their sessions in the books to keep more of the money. Jerry, a regular client and middle-aged construction foreman, engages in a threesome with Molly and Gina. Gina gives him a prostate massage before he engages in aggressive sex with her.

John, another regular client, nervously enters the brothel, but leaves in a rush before having sex with any of the women. Later, Gina tells Molly that she recently broke up with her boyfriend; although he knew about her work and apparently did not mind, Gina wondered how he could love her given her occupation. Molly subsequently confesses to Gina that Diane does not know she is a prostitute. Fred, another client, visits Molly to engage in a sexual roleplay fantasy in which she pretends to be blind.

Lucy returns from her shopping trip, and chastises the women for smoking weed inside the brothel and not keeping the common area tidy. She then proceeds to flaunt the expensive clothing she has purchased for a ski trip. Robert, a young financial advisor, and Joseph, an older attorney, both enter the brothel to meet with the women. Lucy engages in discussion with Robert about what to do with her supply of gold.

Molly goes to have sex with Joseph, and is preemptively warned by Lucy that Joseph likes "light" BDSM, which she typically does not allow the girls to engage in, but makes an exception for Joseph. Miles, Lucy's boyfriend, visits the brothel, and is introduced to several of the girls along with a number of other clients. Debbie, a new employee at the brothel, is casually told by Lucy to not be upset should she make less than the other girls, as she is black and the brothel's clientele tend to prefer white women.

Molly is sent to run errands to pick up a number of items from a drugstore for the girls in the brothel. After, Lucy demands that Molly work overtime that night. Molly meets with Neil, a shy teacher and regular client who gifts her one of his shirts she had previously complimented him on. Despite their transactional sex, Molly and Neil appear to have a platonic friendship, as Molly tries to help coach him on how to treat the women he goes on dates with. During the night shift, Molly again engages in a threesome with a male client and Mary, a new hire who lacks confidence and is uncomfortable with the profession. Lucy angrily returns to the brothel after finding that the phone lines were left on hold by another employee, April.

Paul, a musician client who wishes to see Molly outside of the brothel, visits for an appointment with her. During their sexual encounter, Paul belittles Molly, calling her a whore. The encounter upsets Molly, and she asks Lucy if she can leave, but Lucy informs her she has already made another appointment for Molly with another regular, Elliot, a wealthy fine furniture dealer. During a subsequent staff meeting, Lucy chastises Mary for talking to her child on the phone during a family emergency, in front of clients. Molly and Elliot have sex, and he offers to provide her with enough money to leave the brothel if she should meet him in public. Molly keeps his business card, and after her shift ends, she informs Lucy she is quitting the brothel.

Cast

Production
The film was the second feature film directed by Lizzie Borden. Working Girls depicts the world of prostitution, maintains some of the stylistic and thematic features of her debut, but is more mainstream in its approach. The film was inspired by some of the women who participated in the making of Born in Flames, who coincidentally supported themselves through prostitution. Although Working Girls addresses the subject of prostitution in great detail, Borden prefers the film to be discussed as a narrative fiction film rather than as a documentary. The film was intended to be a "backstage" look at prostitution.

Release
After screening at the Cannes Film Festival, Working Girls was released theatrically in the United States by Miramax, opening in New York City on February 5, 1987. It was a commercial success, grossing $1,777,378 in the U.S. out of the estimated budget of $300,000.

Critical response
Roger Ebert gave the film three out of four stars, saying "... the movie does have ... the feeling of real life being observed accurately. I was moved less by the movie's conscious attempts at artistry than by its unadorned honesty". Sheila Benson of the Los Angeles Times called it "funny and insightful." Vincent Canby of the New York Times wrote a generally positive review, saying 'Working Girls,'' though a work of fiction, sounds as authentic as might a documentary about coal miners. The camera attends to the duties of the ''girls'' without apparent emotional response. Yet, as it watches them smile on their customers, build their egos and affect a totally bogus camaraderie with the men, it's ridiculing the poor slobs who must come to them with their fat wallets in search of pleasure and release."On Rotten Tomatoes, the film holds a rating of 91% from 22 reviews.

Accolades
It won the Special Jury Recognition at the 1987 Sundance Film Festival.

Home media
Anchor Bay Entertainment released the film on DVD in 2001. The film was released  on DVD and Blu-ray by The Criterion Collection on July 13, 2021.

References

External links

Official website
Spectacle Theater
Working Girls: Have You Ever Heard of Surplus Value? an essay by So Mayer at the Criterion Collection

1986 films
1986 drama films
1986 independent films
1986 LGBT-related films
1980s feminist films
Films about prostitution in the United States
Films set in New York City
American LGBT-related films
Lesbian-related films
Films directed by Lizzie Borden (director)
LGBT-related drama films
1980s English-language films
1980s American films
English-language drama films